Kirtlebridge is a village in Dumfries and Galloway, southern Scotland. The village is located where the A74(M) motorway and the West Coast Main Line railway cross the Kirtle Water.

It has one pub, the Village Inn, which has five letting rooms for B&B. It is dog friendly. Evening bar meals are available. There is a Quiz Night every other Monday. The pub is closed on Wednesdays, other days the pub opens at 7.00pm.

Kirtlebridge railway station on the main line formerly served the village, and a nearby junction marked the start of the Solway Junction Railway to Annan. The Kirtlebridge rail crash occurred at the station on 2 October 1872, and resulted in 12 deaths.

Not far from the village is Bonshaw Tower and its more recent adjoining house. The tower was one of a number of structures built along the border as protection against incursions by the British.

References

Villages in Dumfries and Galloway